This is a list of Zimbabwean Twenty20 International cricketers. A Twenty20 International is an international cricket match between two representative teams, each having T20I status, as determined by the International Cricket Council (ICC). A Twenty20 International is played under the rules of Twenty20 cricket. The list is arranged in the order in which each player won his first Twenty20 cap. Where more than one player won his first Twenty20 cap in the same match, those players are listed alphabetically by surname.

Key

List of players
Statistics are correct as of 15 January 2023.

Notes

See also
Twenty20
Zimbabwean cricket team
List of Zimbabwe Test cricketers
List of Zimbabwe ODI cricketers

References

Twenty20
Zimbabwe